Foochow Romanized, also known as Bàng-uâ-cê (BUC for short) or Hók-ciŭ-uâ Lò̤-mā-cê, is a Latin alphabet for the Fuzhou dialect of Eastern Min adopted in the middle of the 19th century by Western missionaries. It had varied at different times, and became standardized in the 1890s. Foochow Romanized was mainly used inside of church circles, and was taught in some mission schools in Fuzhou. However, unlike its counterpart Pe̍h-ōe-jī for Hokkien, even in its prime days Foochow Romanized was by no means universally understood by Christians.

History 

After Fuzhou became one of the five Chinese treaty ports opened by the Treaty of Nanjing at the end of First Opium War (from 1839 to 1842), many Western missionaries arrived in the city. Faced with widespread illiteracy, they developed Latin alphabets for the Fuzhou dialect.

The first attempt in romanizing the Fuzhou dialect was made by the American Methodist M. C. White, who borrowed a system of orthography known as the System of Sir William Jones. In this system, 14 initials were designed exactly according to their voicing and aspiration. This system is described at length in White's linguistic work The Chinese Language Spoken at Fuh Chau.

Subsequent missionaries, including Robert S. Maclay from American Methodist Episcopal Mission, R. W. Stewart from the Church of England and Charles Hartwell from the American Board Mission, further modified White's system in several ways. Since the diacritical marks were all shifted to underneath the vowels, this left room above the vowels which was occupied by the newly introduced tonal marks. Thus Foochow Romanized avoids the potentially awkward diacritic stacking seen for instance in the Vietnamese script, where tone and vowel quality marks both sit above the vowel.

Alphabet 
The sample characters are taken from the Qi Lin Bayin, a renowned phonology book about the Fuzhou dialect written in the Qing Dynasty. The pronunciations are recorded in standard IPA symbols.

Initials

Finals

Finals without codas

Finals with coda

Finals with codas [-ŋ] and [-k]

Tones 

Note that Foochow Romanized uses the breve, not the caron (ˇ), to indicate Yīnpíng and Yángrù tones of Fuzhou dialect.

Sample text

IPA

References

External links 

 Everything You Want To Know About Foochow Romanized (in Foochowese)
 Gô Iók Cŭ: The Old Testament, in Foochow Romanized. 
 Sĭng Iók Cŭ: The New Testament, in Foochow Romanized. 
 An English-Chinese Dictionary of the Foochow Dialect, by T. B. Adam, 1905
 

Latin-script orthographies
Romanization of Chinese
Culture in Fujian